The Girl in 419 is a 1933 American pre-Code drama film directed by Alexander Hall and George Somnes and written by Allen Rivkin, Manuel Seff and P.J. Wolfson. The film stars James Dunn, Gloria Stuart, David Manners, William Harrigan, Shirley Grey and Jack La Rue. The film was released on May 26, 1933, by Paramount Pictures.

Cast 
James Dunn as Dr. Daniel French
Gloria Stuart as Mary Dolan
David Manners as Dr. Martin Nichols
William Harrigan as Peter Lawton
Shirley Grey as Nurse Irene Blaine
Jack La Rue as Sammy
Johnny Hines as Slug
Vince Barnett as Otto Hoffer
Kitty Kelly as Kitty 
Edward Gargan as Lt. 'Babs' Riley
James Burke as Detective Jackson
Clarence Wilson as Walter C. Horton
Gertrude Short as Lucy
Effie Ellsler as Mrs. Young
Hal Price as Rankin

References

External links
 

1933 films
American drama films
1933 drama films
Paramount Pictures films
Films directed by Alexander Hall
Films produced by B. P. Schulberg
American black-and-white films
1930s English-language films
1930s American films